Founded by the people of Chin (Zo), Nang Ka Teih is a town ward within Sagain Division or next to Khampat town in the Myanmar state of Chin and Sagain Division. It has a very high concentration of the religion. Nang Ka Teih is one of the best location in Chin State and listed among the peace area.

References 
 http://www.burmalibrary.org/docs6/MIMU001_A3_SD%20&%20Township%20Overview.pdf
 http://www.maplandia.com/burma/chin/tonzang/
 http://www.themimu.info/

Sagaing Region